Augener & Co. was a music-publishing business in London, established by George Augener (1830–1915), originally "Georg", a German national born in Fechenheim near Frankfurt am Main, who had previously been an apprentice with André's publishing house in Offenbach.

History
The business was founded at 86 Newgate Street, London, in 1855. Later on, London branch warehouses were established at 1 Foubert Place, 22 Golden Square, 81 The Quadrant, Regent Street, and in Brighton at 1 Palace Place. By a change of partnership on 26 February 1887, the warehouse in the Quadrant was transferred to Wesley S. B. Woolhouse, while the general business with this exception remaining George Augener's.

In the late nineteenth century, Augener & Co.'s catalogue contained upwards of 6,000 works, of which nearly 1,000 were cheap volumes; among these was a comprehensive collection of pianoforte classics edited by Ernst Pauer, as well as an important series of educational works edited by him, by John Farmer, and other well-known musicians. To this collection they added the works of some of the most important composers of the New German School, including Xaver Scharwenka, Jean L. Nicodé, and Moszkowski. They had a large and varied stock of music and were the sole agency for the UK of the famous Edition Peters published at Leipzig.

They also published The Monthly Musical Record, a journal which had among its contributors prominent names in English musical literature. At the end of the century, its circulation was about 6,000.

Between 1898 and 1904, Augener purchased Robert Cocks & Co. from Robert Cocks's descendants, Robert Macfarlane Cocks and  Strould Lincoln Cocks.

Company acquisitions
George Augener retired in 1910. At this point, Schott and Co. Ltd., a subsidiary of the music publishing group Schott, acquired the company, but as a German-owned business was expropriated at the outbreak of World War I (1914) – however, with Schott retaining the copyright to the editions they had previously acquired.

Much later, in 1960–1961, the firm acquired the catalogues of UK publishers Joseph Weekes and Joseph Williams. In 1962, Augener & Co. was sold to Galaxy Music of New York and became a division of Galaxy's UK subsidiary, Galliard Ltd., which in turn was sold to Stainer & Bell in 1972.

Correspondence between Augener and music publishing houses in Leipzig from the first half of the 20th century is stored in the Saxon State Archives in Leipzig.

References

Note
 

British companies established in 1855 
Music publishing companies of the United Kingdom
Publishing companies established in 1855
Sheet music publishing companies